Napoléon Charles Bonaparte, 5th Prince of Canino and Musignano (Napoléon Charles Grégoire Jacques Philippe Bonaparte; 5 February 1839 – 11 February 1899), was born in Rome as the son of Charles Lucien Bonaparte and his wife, Zénaïde Bonaparte.

Life and career
Napoléon Charles served in the French Army and saw action during the French intervention in Mexico and the Franco-Prussian War, the latter of which resulted in the downfall of the Second French Empire of his cousin, Emperor Napoléon III.

He was married in Rome on 25 November 1859, to Maria Cristina Ruspoli (1842–1907), daughter of Giovanni Nepomucene Ruspoli, 5th Prince of Cerveteri, and they had three daughters: 
Princess Zénaïde Eugénie Bonaparte (1860–1862)
Princess Mary Bonaparte (1870–1947); married Enrico Gotti.
Princess Eugénie Bonaparte (1872–1949); married and later divorced Léon Napoléon Ney, 4th prince de La Moskowa.

Napoléon Charles succeeded as 5th Prince of Canino and Musignano on 19 November 1895, following the death of his brother Lucien. His cousin, Prince Roland Bonaparte, succeeded him as the 6th Prince of Canino and Musignano but did not assume the title.

Ancestry

References

1839 births
1899 deaths
Napoleon Charles Gregoire Jacques Philippe Bonaparte
Napoleon Charles Gregoire Jacques Philippe Bonaparte
Napoleon Charles Gregoire Jacques Philippe Bonaparte